Hebron is an unincorporated community in Potter County, in the U.S. state of Pennsylvania.

History
A post office called Hebron was established in 1837, and remained in operation until it was discontinued in 1899. The community was named after the ancient city of Hebron.

References

Unincorporated communities in Potter County, Pennsylvania
Unincorporated communities in Pennsylvania